The National Political Union ( (ΕΠΕ), Ethniki Politiki Enosis (EPE)) was a political alliance in Greece in the 1940s.

History
The coalition was founded in 1946 as an alliance of the  National Unionist Party, the Democratic Socialist Party of Greece and the Liberal Party of Venizelists. In the general elections that year the alliance received 19% of the vote, winning 68 seats.

The alliance did not contest any further elections.

See also
 National Political Union (1984)

References

Political parties established in 1946
Defunct political party alliances in Greece